The Utah Museum of Contemporary Art (UMOCA), formerly known as the Salt Lake Art Center, is a contemporary art museum. Located in Downtown Salt Lake City, the museum presents rotating exhibitions by local, national and international contemporary artists throughout its six gallery spaces.

History
The Utah Museum of Contemporary Art was first founded in 1931 as the Art Barn Association by art enthusiast Alta Rawlins Jensen (1884–1980), who dreamed that the Art Barn would "be a retreat where art may be sold, expressed and fostered — a project which Salt Lake has long desired and never quite succeeded in obtaining." In the 1930s, the Art Barn focused its activities on supporting established and emerging Utah artists. Other endeavors included the creation of the Art Bulletin, an art journal featuring events and art reviews. By the early 1940s, the Art Barn gained credibility as an art institution, exhibiting nationally and internationally renowned artists, including a series of oil paintings by Vincent van Gogh.

In 1958, the Art Barn's name changed to the Salt Lake Art Center (SLAC) to better reflect its expanding role in the community, and two years later, the institution hired its first paid full-time director. In 1979, SLAC moved to a new facility in the heart of downtown Salt Lake City, the cultural center of Utah, designed by the Salt Lake architectural firm of FFKR Architects/Planners, for increased and more adequate gallery space. In 1981, Salt Lake City residents and members of the National Endowment for the Arts commissioned Abstract artist Ilya Bolotowsky to create a sculpture outside the center. The 24-foot stainless steel column, titled Column 24, still stands between the museum and Abravanel Hall.

In 2011, SLAC changed its name to the Utah Museum of Contemporary Art (UMOCA) to reflect the organization's function. Since then, UMOCA has expanded its exhibition and community programming, and has been a four-time recipient of funding from the Andy Warhol Foundation as well as a 2015 recipient of the National Endowment for the Arts Art Works grant award.

Since 2011, UMOCA has partnered with the Jarvis and Constance Doctorow Family Foundation to present the biennial Catherine Doctorow Prize for Contemporary Painting to an emerging or mid-career artist who shows a great range of talent and forward-thinking within a contemporary idiom. Past winners have included Firelei Báez (2015), Tala Madani (2013) and Kim Schoenstadt (2011).

Facilities
UMOCA houses two floors and six distinct galleries. In addition, the museum has multiple spaces for events and rentals, including a lobby, courtyard, 155-seat auditorium and meeting rooms. UMOCA also features an education studio, artist-in-residence studios and an art shop, which sells a variety of works by local artists.

The Salt Lake Art Center Photo School is located inside of the museum and offers courses for all skill levels in photography and digital imaging, as well as a photography darkroom and lab for student and public use.

Galleries

Main Gallery: The largest of UMOCA's gallery spaces, the Main Gallery is located on UMOCA's lower level and houses two major group or solo exhibitions throughout each year.
Street Gallery: The Street Gallery is the second largest of UMOCA's galleries and exhibits both solo and group shows, including a solo exhibition of the winner of the biennial Catherine Doctorow Prize for Contemporary Painting. Exhibitions rotate every 2–4 months.
Codec Gallery: The Codec Gallery presents a series of solo exhibitions that usually are thematically in tandem with the current Main Gallery exhibition. Shows rotate every 2–3 months.
Projects Gallery: Situated at the front of the museum, the Projects Gallery showcases artists working in Utah, who are invited to propose exhibitions for the Projects Gallery, which may range from site-specific installations to artist-curated shows. Proposals are reviewed on a rolling basis, and shows rotate every 1–2 months.
A-I-R Space: The A-I-R Space, located on the lower level of the museum, is a dedicated gallery for participants of UMOCA's long-term Artists-in-Residence Program. At the end of their residency, each artist is given the opportunity to showcase the culmination of their work in a museum setting. Shows rotate each month.
Ed. Space: The Ed. Space is UMOCA's newest gallery, located near the Education Studio. Each exhibition is presented in conversation with the museum's youth and family education programs, which include tours, workshops and art projects.

Programs
UMOCA offers a variety of educational and outreach programs, including tours, art activities, films, art talks, community events, and workshops.

Education
Youth programs include the UMOCA Art Truck, a traveling educational art exhibition that brings art to schools and public venues throughout Utah; free hands-on art projects on the second Saturday of each month; summer camps and workshops; and tailored tours for families with young children or sensory-sensitive children.

Additional educational programs include the Artists-in-Residence Program a long-term residency program designed to meet the needs of artists living and working in Utah.

Community Outreach
The museum frequently offers community-wide programming such as art talks and exhibition walk-throughs, film and lecture series, and workshops with visiting artists and curators. UMOCA also maintains several community partnerships, resulting in collaborations with fellow arts nonprofits, community gardens  and more.

Exhibitions
The Utah Museum of Contemporary Art is a non-collecting institution. Exhibitions include both solo and group shows and generally change on a two- to six-month basis. Notable exhibitions since 2011 include:

Kate Ericson & Mel Ziegler, and Mel Ziegler's Grandma's Cupboard (Aug. 28 - Dec. 19, 2015) presented parallel surveys of important projects from Ericson and Ziegler's conceptual art projects of the late 20th century, along with a selection of works from Ziegler's solo career.
Bikuben (Jun. 27 - Dec. 20, 2014) was a group show exploring Danish contemporary art as a framework for understanding how the present may inform the past, as well as a way to highlight the fascinating ties between Denmark and Utah in terms of ideas regarding progress, industry, and utopia.
Analogital (Jan. 18 - Apr. 20, 2013) was an exhibition of international artists who engage with concepts generated from the transitional space between analogue and digital.
Battleground States (Oct. 5, 2012 – Jan. 5, 2013) brought together artists who critically engage with the discourse of visual culture and gender studies. Through video, sculpture, installation, and photography, each work explored ideas of how figuration and identity are connected.
Your Land/My Land: Election '12 by Jonathan Horowitz was a special exhibition coinciding with the 2012 American presidential election. UMOCA joined the Hammer Museum in Los Angeles, the New Museum in New York City, and other museums across the United States in presenting the installation.

References

External links

1931 establishments in Utah
Art museums established in 1931
Art museums and galleries in Utah
Contemporary art galleries in the United States
Museums in Salt Lake City